The Kh-55 (also known as RKV-500; NATO reporting name: AS-15 "Kent") is a Soviet/Russian subsonic air-launched cruise missile, designed by MKB Raduga in the 1970s. Kh-55 is launched exclusively from bomber aircraft and has spawned a number of conventionally armed variants mainly for tactical use, such as the Kh-65SE and Kh-SD, but only the Kh-101 and Kh-555 appear to have been put into service. Contrary to popular belief, the Kh-55 was not the basis of the submarine and ground-launched S-10 Granat or RK-55 Relief (SS-N-21"Sampson" and SSC-X-4"Slingshot") designed by NPO Novator. The RK-55 is very similar to the air-launched Kh-55 (AS-15 "Kent") but the Kh-55 has a drop-down turbofan engine and was designed by MKB Raduga.

Development
In the late 1960s, the "Ekho" study conducted by the GosNIIAS institute concluded that it would be more effective to deploy many small, subsonic cruise missiles than the much more expensive supersonic missiles then in favour. Work started at the Raduga bureau on an air-launched cruise missile in 1971, with a first test flight in 1976. The appearance of the US Air Force's AGM-86 ALCM in that year gave further impetus to the programme, with the Soviet Air Force issuing a formal requirement for a new air-launched cruise  missile in December 1976. The longer-range Kh-55SM was developed a few years after the original went into service. In the late 1980s work began on a replacement missile with either conventional (Kh-101/X-101) or nuclear (Kh-102) warheads and greater stealth. It was designed by Igor Seleznyev of Raduga. The importance of advanced missiles as "force multipliers" increased as Russia's fleet of available cruise-missile bombers declined in the early 1990s. The cancellation of the ambitious Kh-90 ramjet missile due to INF Treaty in 1987 led to a renewed emphasis on improving the Kh-55, in particular to achieve the <20 m accuracy required to hit infrastructure targets with conventionalas opposed to nuclearwarheads. The first flight of the Kh-101 was in 1998, and evaluation trials started in 2000.

After the end of the Cold War and anti-proliferation treaties restricting the deployment of long-range nuclear missiles, the Russians made efforts to develop tactical versions of the Kh-55 with conventional warheads.  First came the 600 km-range Kh-65SE (derived from the Kh-55) announced in 1992, then the 300 km-range Kh-SD tactical version of the Kh-101 for export, and finally the Kh-555. In 2001 the Russian Air Force are believed to have selected the Kh-101 and Kh-555 for development.

A 1995 Russian document suggested that a complete production facility had been transferred to Shanghai, for the development of a nuclear-armed cruise missile. Originally it was thought that this was based on the 300 km-range Raduga Kh-15 (AS-16 "Kickback"), but it now appears that it was the Kh-55 that was transferred to China.

Kh-101/102 (X-101/102)

Kh-101/102 is the latest development of the Kh-55, incorporating a low radar cross-section of about 0.01 square meters. The Kh-101/102 is specifically designed for air-launch, abandoning the circular fuselage cross-section of the Kh-55 for a nose and forward fuselage section aerodynamically shaped to produce lift. With a flight endurance of 10 hours; long range is essential since Russia has few bases abroad and cannot provide distant fighter escorts. The Tu-95MS can carry eight of the weapons on four under-wing pylons, and the Tu-160 can be outfitted with two drum launchers each loaded with six missiles, but the smaller Tu-22M3 will continue to carry the Kh-55, although it can also carry the Kh-101/Kh-102. The missiles are equipped with an onboard EW defence system as of late 2018. The first tests were conducted in 1995 and the missile was accepted for service in 2012.

The Kh-101 missile is estimated to cost US$13 million.

Design

It is powered by a single 400 kgf Ukrainian-made, Motor Sich JSC R95-300 turbofan engine, with pop-out wings for cruising efficiency. It can be launched from both high and low altitudes, and flies at subsonic speeds at low levels (under 110 m/300 ft altitude). After launch, the missile's folded wings, tail surfaces and engine deploy. It is guided through a combination of an inertial guidance system plus a terrain contour-matching guidance system which uses radar and images stored in the memory of an onboard computer to find its target. This allows the missile to guide itself to the target with a high degree of accuracy.

The original Kh-55 had a drop-down engine; the Kh-65SE had a fixed external turbojet engine, while the Kh-SD had its engine inside the body of the missile. Production versions in 2013 were equipped with the increased-power 450 kgf Russian-made NPO Saturn TRDD-50A engine.

The mass-size simulator for the warhead is designated KTS-120-12.

Operational history

The original Kh-55 entered service on 31 December 1983. The Kh-55SM followed in 1987. The conventionally armed Kh-55SE was flight tested on 13 January 2000, and first used in exercises over the Black Sea 17–22 April 2000. The Kh-555 is thought to have entered service in 2004, the first pictures of the Kh-101 appeared in 2007.

The Kh-55 can be carried by the Tu-95MS (NATO "Bear-H") and Tu-142M (NATO "Bear-F"), and the Kh-55SM is carried by the Tupolev Tu-160 "White Swan" (NATO "Blackjack"). Sixteen Kh-55's can be carried by the Tu-95MS16 variant, ten on underwing hardpoints and six on an MKU-5-6 rotary launcher. The missile was also tested on the Tu-22M (NATO "Backfire") bombers.

The Kh-SD tactical version was to have been carried by the Tu-95MS (fourteen missiles) and the Tu-22M (eight missiles). The Kh-101 is expected to be carried by the Tu-160 (twelve missiles), Tu-95MS16 (eight missiles), Tu-22M3 (four missiles) and Su-34 (two missiles).

The end of the Cold War left Ukraine with 1,612 Kh-55s, part of the armament of the 19 Tu-160s of the 184th Heavy Bomber Regiment at Pryluky and the 25 Tu-95MSs of the 182nd Heavy Bomber Regiment at Uzin-Shepelovka. It was reported that Ukraine demanded US$3 billion for the return of the planes and their missiles to Russia. In October 1999, a compromise was reached that saw Russia pay US$285 million for eight Tu-160 and three Tu-95MS bombers and 575 Kh-55 cruise missiles, while the rest were meant to be destroyed under U.S.-led Nunn–Lugar Cooperative Threat Reduction programme. However, in March 2005 Ukraine's prosecutor-general Sviatoslav Piskun said that in 2001, twelve Kh-55s had been exported to Iran in a deal said to be worth US$49.5 million, and an additional six Kh-55s were exported to China. In March 2015, Iran subsequently revealed the existence of the Soumar cruise missile.

Syrian Civil War
In the course of the Russian military intervention in the Syrian Civil War on 17 November 2015, Russian Defence Ministry reported that Tupolev Tu-95MS and Tupolev Tu-160 strategic bombers launched a total of 34 air-launched cruise missiles against 14 ISIL targets in Syria. While the Tu-95MS used the Kh-55 cruise missiles, the Tu-160 were equipped with the stealthy Kh-101 variant in their first combat use.

Russian news agency TASS reported on 17 November 2016 that modernized Tu-95MS armed with Kh-555 and Kh-101 air-launched cruise missiles had launched airstrikes against targets described as terrorist in Syria.

On 17 February 2017, Tu-95MS strategic bombers, flying from the Russian territory through the airspace of Iran and Iraq, attacked purported ISIL facilities near the Syrian city of Raqqa with the Kh-101 cruise missiles. The targets included purported militant camps and training centers as well as a command center of a major ISIL unit. Russian Tu-95MS long-range bombers struck ISIL targets in Syria again on 5 July 2017, at a range of about 1,000 kilometers. On 26 September 2017, Russia's Tu-95MS strategic bombers carried out further missile strikes with Kh-101 on ISIL and the Syrian branch of al-Qaeda (now known as Hayat Tahrir al-Sham) in the provinces of Idlib and Deir Ezzor.

2022 invasion of Ukraine

The Kh-101 has been used extensively in the 2022 Russian invasion of Ukraine. US Department of Defense sources claimed that they experienced a not-insignificant failure rate: "either they're failing to launch, or they're failing to hit the target, or they're failing to explode on contact.". Ukraine at War: Paving the Road from Survival to Victory, a July 2022 study published by the UK Royal United Services Institute (RUSI) for Defense and Security Studies, agreeing, according to testimonies from Ukrainian military specialists and inspection of missile components, saying "Briefings by the Pentagon have reported that a large number of Russian cruise missiles fail to either find their targets or malfunction and crash in flight. As far as Ukrainian military scientists can determine, this is actually quite rare."

On 6 March 2022, about eight Kh-101 cruise missiles launched by Tu-160 and Tu-95MS strategic bombers from over the Black Sea targeted the Havryshivka Vinnytsia International Airport.

On 14 September 2022, Ukrainian MoD reported Russian forces used eight Kh-101 cruise missiles, probably from Tu-95MS bombers, to target various hydraulic structures in Kryvyi Rih. This caused the water level of the Inhulets river to rise sharply. Previously it was reported that Kh-22 missiles had been used.

The UK Ministry of Defence said in November 2022 that it appeared that Russian forces, due to very much depleted weapons stores, were firing old AS-15 Kent cruise missiles with the nuclear warheads apparently replaced by inert ballast, hoping merely to distract Ukrainian air defenses. However the missiles can still pose a serious risk due to their kinetic energy and any unspent fuel left in the missile that might explode.

Variants
 Kh-55 (NATO "Kent-A", RKV-500A, Izdeliye 120) - original model with 2,500 km range. 
 Kh-55-OK - with optical guidance.
 Kh-55SM (NATO "Kent-B", RKV-500B, Izdeliye 121) - with extra fuel tanks to extend range to 3000 km. 
 Kh-101/102 (Izdeliye 111) - developed as a stealthy replacement for the Kh-55SM in the late 1990s, the Kh-101 has a conventional warhead and the Kh-102 is thermonuclear. This missile weighs some 2,200 - 2,400 kg, the weight of warhead is 400–450 kg. According to reports, the Kh-101 has a maximum range of 4500–5500 km and a variable flight profile at altitudes ranging from 30 – 70 m to 6000 m, a cruising speed of 190–200 m/s and a maximum speed of 250–270 m/s. The missile is equipped with an electro-optical system for correcting the flight trajectory and with a TV guidance system for terminal guidance. Its official range is 4,500 km or 3,000 km with a conventional payload. It is re-targetable. The missiles are expected to be accurate within 10–20 m CEP. They are expected to be in service in required numbers by 2023. The new missile complex has been successfully tested and in recent years put into series production to equip modernized Tu-160 and Tu-95MSM bombers.
 Kh-65SE - tactical version announced in 1992 with 410 kg conventional warhead and restricted to the 600 km range  limit (expired on 2.8.2019) of the INF treaty.
 Kh-55/65SD (средней дальности Srednei Dalnosti - "Medium Range") - 300 km range conventional version announced in 1995, possibly for export. Shared components with the Kh-101, range reportedly increased to 600 km with a high-altitude approach, but the Kh-SD was apparently shelved in 2001. An alternative active radar seeker was proposed for anti-shipping use.
 Kh-555 (NATO "Kent-C", Kh-55SE, Kh-55Sh) - conventionally armed version with an improved guidance system and warhead. It became operational in 2000. Entered service in 2004.
 Kh-BD conventional and nuclear armed version with said range up to 3000 km or greater, near or more than 5000 km range.
 Kh-50 or Kh-SD new stealthy short to medium (300 to 1500–1900 km) ranges and conventional (or also nuclear) variant (somewhat analogue of AGM-158 JASSM). Length is 6m, Uses inertial/GLONASS/DSMAC guidance
 Soumar - Missile likely derived from the Kh-55 produced by Iran.

It was believed originally that the RK-55 (SSC-X-4 "Slingshot" and SS-N-21 "Sampson") were land- and submarine-launched derivatives of the Kh-55, but it is now known that the Kh-55 is different from the other two as its motor drops down below the missile during flight.

Operators

Current operators
 : acquired 12 from Ukraine.
 : acquired 6 from Ukraine.
 : the Russian Air Force uses the Kh-55SM, Kh-555 and the newest Kh-101/102.

Former operators
 : the Soviet Air Force deployed the Kh-55 as its original operator, passed to successor states after the dissolution of the Soviet Union.
 
 : ~487 scrapped, ~587 returned to Russia

See also
 3M-54 Kalibr – developed from the Kh-55
 RK-55 – so similar to the Kh-55 it was long believed in the West to be merely a sub-/surface-launched version 
 AGM-86 Air-Launched Cruise Missile – 1430 kg missile with 2400+ km range, Mach 0.73
 AGM-129 ACM (Advanced Cruise Missile – stealthy 1330 kg missile with 3700 km range) (decommissioned)
 Ra'ad ALCM - Comparable Pakistani missile of similar operational history
 BGM-109 Tomahawk – surface/sub- launched, but otherwise similar to the Kh-55
 Nirbhay (India) – Nirbhay is an all-weather low-cost medium-range cruise missile 
 CJ-10 – Chinese land-attack cruise missile, believed to have incorporated elements from the Kh-55
 Soumar – Iranian land-attack cruise missile
 Meshkat
 Hoveyzeh
paveh
 Babur missile  Pakistani missile
 Korshun – Ukrainian land-attack cruise missile in development

Notes

References

Bibliography

External links

CSIS Missile Threat - KH-55
worldweapon.ru   - has good pics at the bottom
GlobalSecurity.org - Kh-55 
fas.org - AS-15 KENT
  - Excellent review of the routes by which Kh-55 technology has proliferated.

Nuclear cruise missiles of the Soviet Union
Nuclear cruise missiles of Russia
Cruise missiles of Russia
Cruise missiles of the Soviet Union
MKB Raduga products
Nuclear air-to-surface missiles
Military equipment introduced in the 1990s